Ivanhoe (Ivan) Borch Rohrt (23 March 1920 – 9 March 2016) was a former president of the Carlton Football Club from 1974 to 1977.  He was also appointed as a director on the Victorian Football League Board.

References

External links
 Ivan Rohrt at Blueseum
 Three new Directors at League Board table

1920 births
2016 deaths
Carlton Football Club administrators